DNA-binding protein RFX5 is a protein that in humans is encoded by the RFX5 gene.

Function 

A lack of MHC-II expression results in a severe immunodeficiency syndrome called MHC-II deficiency, or the bare lymphocyte syndrome (BLS; MIM 209920). At least 4 complementation groups have been identified in B-cell lines established from patients with BLS. The molecular defects in complementation groups B, C, and D all lead to a deficiency in RFX, a nuclear protein complex that binds to the Xbox of MHC-II promoters. The lack of RFX binding activity in complementation group C results from mutations in the RFX5 gene encoding the 75-kD subunit of RFX (Steimle et al., 1995). RFX5 is the fifth member of the growing family of DNA-binding proteins sharing a novel and highly characteristic DNA-binding domain called the RFX motif. Multiple alternatively spliced transcript variants have been found but the full-length natures of only two have been determined.

Interactions 

RFX5 has been shown to interact with CIITA.

References

Further reading

External links 
 
 

Transcription factors